Bent-Ove Pedersen (born 11 July 1967, in Oslo) is a former tennis player from Norway, who turned professional in 1992.

Biography
He spent several years playing tennis at Berkeley in California. The right-hander represented his native country in the doubles competition at the 1992 Summer Olympics in Barcelona, where he partnered Christian Ruud. The pair was defeated in the first round by South Africa's eventual runners-up Wayne Ferreira and Piet Norval. Pedersen reached his highest singles ATP-ranking on 13 September 1993, when he became the number 366 of the world. He was in quarterfinal in US Open doubles, 1991, partnering Matt Lucena from the US. He became the number 78 on the doubles ranking 30. August 1993.

Career finals

Doubles (1 win, 1 loss)

References

External links
 
 

1967 births
Living people
Norwegian male tennis players
Tennis players at the 1992 Summer Olympics
Olympic tennis players of Norway
California Golden Bears men's tennis players
Sportspeople from Oslo
20th-century Norwegian people